Pearl Lake is a lake located on Vancouver Island is an expansion of Oyster River near head and east of Buttle Lake.

References

Alberni Valley
Lakes of Vancouver Island
Comox Land District